The 2014 Meistriliiga, also known as A. Le Coq Premium Liiga due to sponsorship reasons, was the 24th season of the Meistriliiga, the first level in the Estonian football system. The season ran from 1 March 2014 to 8 November 2014. Levadia successfully defended the title, securing the championship in the last round.

Teams
Kuressaare were relegated to the 2014 Esiliiga after finishing in the bottom of the table at the end of the 2013 season, ending their five-year tenure in the top flight. They were replaced by Lokomotiv, Esiliiga runners-up and first among promotion-eligible teams. Lokomotiv will make their first appearance in the top division.

One spot in the league was decided in a two-legged play-off between Esiliiga's 4th Tarvas and Meistriliiga's 9th-placed team Tammeka. Tammeka won 6–2 on aggregate and therefore retained its place in Meistriliiga.

Tammeka hit financial trouble in the second half of 2013 season, but refused the reorganization plan set by Estonian Football Association. In February Tammeka were stripped of their Meistriliiga license. Tammeka entry was later granted for 2014 season to Football School Tammeka, financially independent part of the club run by former employees of football club Tammeka.

Stadiums and locations

Personnel and kits
Note: Flags indicate national team as has been defined under FIFA eligibility rules. Players and Managers may hold more than one non-FIFA nationality.

Managerial changes

Player transfers
 Transfers made during the 2013–14 winter transfer window (3 January – 28 February 2014)

 Transfers made during the 2014 summer transfer window (20 June – 20 July 2014)

League table

Relegation play-offs
At season's end Lokomotiv, the ninth place club in the Meistriliiga, participated in a two-legged play-off with Tulevik, the runners-up (of the independent teams) of the 2014 Esiliiga, for the spot in next year's competition.

1–1 on aggregate. Tulevik won on away goals and secured promotion to 2015 Meistriliiga

Results
Each team plays every opponent four times, twice at home and twice away, for a total of 36 games.

First-half of season

Second-half of season

Season statistics

Top scorers

Hat-tricks

Notes
4 Player scored 4 goals(H) – Home team(A) – Away team

Awards

Meistriliiga Player of the Year
Yevgeni Kabaev was named Meistriliiga Player of the Year.

See also
 2013–14 Estonian Cup
 2014–15 Estonian Cup
 2014 Esiliiga
 2014 Esiliiga B

References

Meistriliiga seasons
1
Estonia
Estonia